Alternaria saponariae is a fungal plant pathogen.

References

External links

saponariae
Fungal plant pathogens and diseases
Fungi described in 1938